The world record in the mile run is the fastest time set by a runner in the middle-distance track and field event. World Athletics is the official body which oversees the records. Hicham El Guerrouj is the current men's record holder with his time of 3:43.13, while Sifan Hassan has the women's record of 4:12.33. Since 1976, the mile has been the only non-metric distance recognized by the IAAF for record purposes. However, in international competitions such as the Olympics the term "mile" almost always refers to a distance of 1,500 meters, which is 109.344 meters shorter than an Imperial mile,  even though four "full" laps of a 400 meter track is equal to 1,600 meters. 

Accurate times for the mile run (1.609344 km) have been recorded since 1850, when the first precisely measured running tracks were built. Foot racing had become popular in England by the 17th century, when footmen would race and their masters would wager on the result. By the 19th century "pedestrianism", as it was called, had become extremely popular and the best times recorded in the period were by professionals. Even after professional foot racing died out, it was not until 1915 that the professional record of 4:12 (set by Walter George in 1886) was surpassed by an amateur.

Progression of the mile record accelerated in the 1930s as newsreel coverage greatly popularized the sport, making stars out of milers such as Jules Ladoumègue, Jack Lovelock, and Glenn Cunningham. In the 1940s, Swedes Arne Andersson and Gunder Hägg lowered the record to just over four minutes (4:01.4) while racing was curtailed during World War II in the combatant countries. After the war, Roger Bannister of the United Kingdom and John Landy of Australia vied to be the first to break the fabled four-minute mile barrier. Roger Bannister did it first on May 6, 1954, and John Landy followed 46 days later. By the end of the 20th century, the record had been lowered to the time of 3:43.13 run by Hicham El Guerrouj of Morocco in 1999.

On the women's side, the first sub-5:00 mile was achieved by the UK's Diane Leather 23 days after Bannister's first sub-4:00 mile. However, the International Association of Athletics Federations (IAAF) did not recognize women's records for the distance until 1967, when Anne Smith of the UK ran 4:37.0. The current women's world record is 4:12.33 by Sifan Hassan, set on July 12, 2019.

Men

Pre-IAAF

Professionals

Amateurs

As there was no recognized official sanctioning body until 1912, there are several versions of the mile progression before that year. One version starts with Richard Webster (GBR) who ran 4:36.5 in 1865, surpassed by Chinnery in 1868.

Another variation of the amateur record progression pre-1862 is as follows:

IAAF era

The first world record in the mile for men (athletics) was recognized by the International Amateur Athletics Federation (later known as the International Association of Athletics Federations and currently known as World Athletics) in 1913.

To June 21, 2009, the IAAF has ratified 32 world records in the event.

The "Time" column indicates the ratified mark; the "Auto" column indicates a fully automatic time that was also recorded in the event when hand-timed marks were used for official records, or which was the basis for the official mark, rounded to the 10th of a second, depending on the rules then in place.

Records for the mile were rounded up to the nearest tenth of a second commencing January 1, 1957. Previously, records were rounded up to the nearest fifth of a second. Those rounded-up marks were: Cunningham's 4:06.8 (timed at 4:06.7); Hägg's 4:06.2 (4:06.1); Hägg's 4:01.4 (4:01.3); Landy's 3:58.0 (3:57.9). Landy's mark was not retroactively adjusted when the new rule came into effect. Auto times to the hundredth of a second were accepted by the IAAF for events up to and including 10,000 m beginning in 1981.

During the most recent world record setting race in 1999, Noah Ngeny came in second place to Hicham El Guerrouj with a time of 3:43.40, which continues to be the second fastest mile run in history, beating out the old world record set in 1993 by Noureddine Morceli.

Men's Indoor

Men Indoor Pre-IAAF

Men Indoor IAAF era

The IAAF started to recognize indoor world records in 1987, with the then world's best time, Coghlan's 3:49.78, ratified as the inaugural record for the mile.

Women

Pre-IAAF

Women's IAAF era

The first world record in the mile for women (athletics) was recognized by the International Amateur Athletics Federation, now known as the International Association of Athletics Federations, in 1967. To June 21, 2009, the IAAF has ratified 13 world records in the event.

The "Time" column indicates the ratified mark; the "Auto" column indicates a fully automatic time that was also recorded in the event when hand-timed marks were used for official records, or which was the basis for the official mark, rounded to the 10th of a second, depending on the rules then in place.

The IAAF recognized times to the hundredth of a second starting in 1981.

Note:
 Decker ran 4:17.55 indoors in Houston on 16 February 1980, but this time was rejected as a record due to an oversized track.
 Natalya Artyomova (Soviet Union) ran 4:15.8 in Leningrad on 6 August 1984, but this time was rejected as a record due to there being no international judges.

Women's Indoor

Women Indoor Pre-IAAF

Women Indoor IAAF era

See also
 1500 metres world record progression

References

Further reading

External links
Runner's World data
Running Times Magazine data
Frankfurt University  (Internet Archive)
Women's progression
Another women's mile progression
Frankfurt University (Women's progression)  (Internet Archive)
Clips of Banister's 4 minute mile
Video of current Men's world record by Hicham El Guerrouj

World athletics record progressions
Mile races